The Caucasian lynx (Lynx lynx dinniki), also known as the Caucasus lynx or the eastern lynx, is a subspecies of Eurasian lynx native in the Caucasus, Iran, Turkey, and European Russia.

Conservation  
It is proposed for the Caucasian lynx to be listed as Vulnerable in Iran.
In Azerbaijan, it is listed as Least Concern, and as Critically Endangered in Georgia.
Some work has been done in Armenia to determine a conservation plan.

See also
 Absheron National Park
 Siberian lynx

References

Eurasian lynx subspecies
Mammals described in 1915
Mammals of Russia
Mammals of the Middle East